Clyde 2 is an Independent Local Radio station based in Glasgow, Scotland, owned and operated by Bauer as part of the Greatest Hits Radio network. It broadcasts to Glasgow and West Central Scotland. 

As of December 2022, the station has a weekly audience of 166,000 listeners according to RAJAR.

The station is due to be rebranded to Greatest Hits Radio Glasgow and the West on 3 April 2023.

Programming
Most of Clyde 2's programming is produced and broadcast from the station's Clydebank studios and carried on Greatest Hits Radio's network of locally branded Scottish stations. Some weekend output is produced by Tay 2 in Dundee and Forth 2 in Edinburgh. Occasional programming is produced and broadcast from MFR 2 in Inverness, Northsound 2 in Aberdeen and West Sound in Ayrshire and Dumfries and Galloway

Some off-peak output is produced from GHR's Birmingham, Nottingham, London and Manchester studios and broadcast on both networks in Scotland and England.

News
Clyde 2 broadcasts local news bulletins hourly from 6am to 7pm on weekdays and from 7am to 1pm at weekends. Headlines are broadcast on the half hour during weekday breakfast and drivetime shows, alongside sport and traffic bulletins.

The Clydebank newsroom also produces bespoke national Scottish bulletins at weekends with Sky News Radio bulletins carried overnight.

See also 
Radio Clyde
Clyde 1

References

External links

Greatest Hits Radio
Radio stations established in 1973
Radio stations in Glasgow